Symplectochilus is a genus of flowering plants belonging to the family Acanthaceae.

Its native range is Southern Tropical and Southern Africa, Madagascar.

Species:

Symplectochilus formosissimus 
Symplectochilus madagascariensis

References

Acanthaceae
Acanthaceae genera